Claudia Hollingsworth (born 12 April 2005) is an Australian athlete. In 2022, she became the Oceanic champion in the 1500 metres at 17 years old.

Hollingsworth is a student at Mentone Grammar and was a keen Australian rules football player, playing for the East Brighton Vampires and the Sandringham Dragons, and considered a future application to the AFL Women's draft process before deciding to focus on track and field athletics. Hollingsworth is coached by four-time Olympian and former world 5000m bronze medallist Craig Mottram.

Hollingsworth was selected for the Australian team to compete in the 2021 World U20 Championships, but ultimately the team didn’t travel to Nairobi for the Championships due to the COVID-19 pandemic. Hollingsworth was competing with Olympic standard athletes before she was sixteen years old. In March 2021, Hollingsworth aged 15 ran the fastest ever time world wide for an U18 athlete in a 1000 metres race.

Hollingsworth won the 2022 Oceania Athletics Championships  in the 1500 metres and was runner up in the 800 metres. Hollingsworth was chosen to compete for Australia at the 2022 World Athletics Championships – Women's 800 metres. Due to her young age Hollingsworth could only choose one distance race to compete in, and chose the 800 metres over the 1500 metres, but stated her desire to race the longer distance at the 2022 World Athletics U20 Championships.

References

2005 births
Living people
World Athletics Championships athletes for Australia
21st-century Australian women
21st-century Australian people
Sportswomen from Victoria (Australia)
Australian female middle-distance runners